Nonclassical carbocations are stabilized by charge delocalization from contributions of neighbouring  or  bonds, which can form bridged intermediates or transition states. Nonclassical ions have been extensively studied with the 2-norbornyl system, which as “naked” ion unambiguously exhibit such a bridged structure. The landmark of nonclassical ions are unexpectedly fast solvolysis rates and large differences between epimeric esters. Such behaviour is not restricted to 2-norbornyl esters, as has been shown with some cyclopentyl and steroidal esters with the tosyloxy leaving group.
Substitution reactions of secondary esters occur by SN2- or SN1-like mechanisms.  Only in highly polar solvents such as hexafluoroisopropanol (HFIP) of low nucleophilicity one can expect a nearly same uniform SN1-like mechanism. The solvolysis of several cyclopentyl and steroidal esters show that large solvolysis rates and differences between epimers can occur which surpass those of the 2-norbornyl system. In these cases a vicinal  C–C or C–H bond can lead to significant delocalization of the positive charge, if these  bonds are close to antiperiplanar to the leaving group, and the migration leads to a more stable tertiary carbocation. The reaction products in these cases always result from the migration of the neighbouring bond.

The reaction of epimeric esters can be severely slowed by steric hindrance of solvation.

Solvolysis of cyclopropylcarbinyl, cyclobutyl and homoallyl esters are also characterized by very large rates, and have been shown to occur via a common nonclassical ion structure in the form of a bicyclobutonium ion.

See also
 2-Norbornyl cation
 Neighbouring group participation
 Carbocation
 Steric effects
 Solvation

References

Carbocations
Ions
Organic chemistry